Zsolt Zsombor (born 4 January 1972) is a Hungarian bobsledder. He competed at the 1998 Winter Olympics and the 2002 Winter Olympics.

References

1972 births
Living people
Hungarian male bobsledders
Olympic bobsledders of Hungary
Bobsledders at the 1998 Winter Olympics
Bobsledders at the 2002 Winter Olympics
Sportspeople from Budapest